Dennis Antonio Sánchez Fernández (born 24 June 1962) is a Honduran politician. He currently serves as deputy of the National Congress of Honduras representing the Liberal Party of Honduras for Santa Bárbara.

References

1962 births
Living people
People from Santa Bárbara Department, Honduras
Deputies of the National Congress of Honduras
Liberal Party of Honduras politicians
Place of birth missing (living people)